Syngrapha viridisigma, known generally as the spruce false looper or green-marked looper, is a species of looper moth in the family Noctuidae. It is found in North America.

The MONA or Hodges number for Syngrapha viridisigma is 8929.

References

Further reading

External links

 

Plusiini
Articles created by Qbugbot
Moths described in 1874